Asmita is an Indian Marathi language crime show which aired on Zee Marathi. It starred Mayuri Wagh and Piyush Ranade in lead roles.

Plot 
It is a story of Asmita, a private detective lady, where she solve crime cases with her partners.

Cast 
 Mayuri Wagh as Asmita Prabhakar Agnihotri / Asmita Abhiman Saranjame
 Piyush Ranade as Abhiman Saranjame
 Sulabha Deshpande as Abhiman's grandmother
 Amruta Deshmukh as Vaidehi Saranjame
 Ajay Purkar as Dadasaheb Saranjame
 Yogesh Sohoni as Siddheshwar (Sid)
 Ashwini Mahangade as Manali
 Vikas Patil as Bandoji
 Raju Athawale as Daji
 Shaila Kanekar as Abhiman's mother

Reception

Seasons 
 Asmita Shodhala Ki Sapadtacha (5 February 2014)
 Asmita Gunhyala Mafi Nahi (20 January 2016)

Ratings

Airing history

Awards

Adaptations

References

External links 
 
 
 Asmita at ZEE5

Marathi-language television shows
2014 Indian television series debuts
Zee Marathi original programming
2017 Indian television series endings